Wiqruqucha (Quechua wiqru twisted, bent qucha lake, "bent lake", also spelled Huecrococha) is a lake in Peru located in the Ancash Region, Mariscal Luzuriaga Province, Lucma District. Wiqruqucha lies in the Cordillera Blanca, southeast of Tawllirahu and east of Pukarahu and a lake named Urqunqucha.

References 

Lakes of Peru
Lakes of Ancash Region